Zdzisław Szczęsny Kawecki-Gozdawa (May 21, 1902 in Husiatyn – April 1940 in Katyn) was a Polish horse rider who competed in the 1936 Summer Olympics.

In 1936 he and his horse Bambino won the silver medal as part of the Polish eventing team, after finishing 18th in the individual eventing competition.

Kawecki was killed by Soviet forces in the Katyn massacre in April 1940, aged 37.

References

External links
profile 
dataOlympics profile

1902 births
1940 deaths
People from Husiatyn
Polish male equestrians
Event riders
Olympic equestrians of Poland
Equestrians at the 1936 Summer Olympics
Olympic silver medalists for Poland
Katyn massacre victims
Olympic medalists in equestrian
Medalists at the 1936 Summer Olympics
Polish military personnel killed in World War II